Urpi Marka (Quechua urpi dove, marka village, "dove village", also spelled Urpimarca) is a  mountain in the Wansu mountain range in the Andes of Peru. It is situated in the Apurímac Region, Antabamba Province, Juan Espinoza Medrano District. Urpi Marka lies west Sara Sara.

References 

Mountains of Peru
Mountains of Apurímac Region